CrossCheck is a 2017 initiative from Google Labs and First Draft to support truth and verification in media.

References

Initiatives